Motility is an album by American jazz pianist and composer Steve Kuhn and his band Ecstasy recorded in 1977 and released on the ECM label.

Reception 
The Allmusic review by Ken Dryden awarded the album 3 stars stating "This is one of Steve Kuhn's more unusual studio sessions, which was recorded for ECM in 1977. At times, the pianist seems less like a post-bop musician and more like someone dabbling in new-age music".

Track listing 
All compositions by Steve Kuhn except as indicated.

 "The Rain Forest" - 6:13
 "Oceans in the Sky" - 5:07
 "Catherine" (Harvie Swartz) - 5:34
 "Bittersweet Passages" - 4:54
 "Deep Tango" - 7:27
 "Motility / The Child is Gone" - 7:21
 "A Danse for One" - 3:03
 "Places I've Never Been" (Swartz) - 4:52

Personnel 
 Steve Kuhn - piano 
 Steve Slagle - soprano saxophone, alto saxophone, flute
 Harvie Swartz - bass 
 Michael Smith - drums

References 

ECM Records albums
Steve Kuhn albums
1977 albums
Albums produced by Manfred Eicher